Maximiliano Manuel Alaníz Moreno (born 1 May 1990) is a retired Argentine footballer who played as a forward.

References
 
 

1990 births
Living people
Argentine footballers
Sportspeople from Mendoza, Argentina
Association football forwards
Godoy Cruz Antonio Tomba footballers
Huracán de Comodoro Rivadavia footballers
Magallanes footballers
Puerto Montt footballers
Deportes Valdivia footballers
San Antonio Unido footballers
Asociación Atlética Luján de Cuyo players
Argentine Primera División players
Torneo Argentino B players
Primera B de Chile players
Segunda División Profesional de Chile players
Argentine expatriate footballers
Expatriate footballers in Chile
Argentine expatriate sportspeople in Chile